The Ninety-first Minnesota Legislature is the legislature of the U.S. state of Minnesota from January 8, 2019 to January 4, 2021. It is composed of the Senate and House of Representatives, based on the results of the 2016 Senate election and 2018 House election. It first convened and held its regular session in Saint Paul from January 8 to May 20, 2019, and from February 11 to May 18, 2020. A special session was held from May 24 to 25, 2019, to pass bills enacting the state budget following an agreement between the governor and legislative leaders during the final weekend of the regular session in 2019.

Another special session was held from June 12 to 20, 2020, which was required by state law as Governor Tim Walz extended Minnesota's peacetime emergency in response to the COVID-19 pandemic. It also the followed the murder of George Floyd in Minneapolis and the subsequent protests. Walz and several legislators said they intended to use the special session to address concerns raised by Floyd's murder related to racial inequities in policing, on which the House and Senate were unable to reach an agreement. They were also unable to reach agreements on a public works borrowing bill, appropriating money from the CARES Act to local governments, and assistance for Minneapolis and Saint Paul for damage caused by riots in those cities. Senate Majority Leader Paul Gazelka had said at the beginning of the special session Republicans would adjourn the Senate by June 19 regardless of whatever legislation had or had not been passed by the Legislature, which House Speaker Melissa Hortman said was an arbitrary deadline. Gazelka said at the end of the special session a deadline was needed to force discussions and was willing to return for another special session when there were agreements on these issues.

On July 10, 2020, Walz called a third special session that was held from July 13 to 21, 2020, as he again extended the peacetime emergency. The Legislature passed a bill on police reform, but was unable to reach an agreement on a public works borrowing bill. Five more special sessions were called by the Governor throughout the remainder of the year, all of which were to approve the extension of the COVID-19 peacetime emergency. In total, seven special sessions were held this term, the most of any term in state history.

Major events
 April 3, 2019: Governor Tim Walz delivered his first State of the State Address.
 May 9, 2019: A joint convention of the Senate and House of Representatives was held to elect regents of the University of Minnesota.
April 5, 2020: Walz delivered his second State of the State Address. Originally scheduled to be held on March 23 in the House chamber, it was postponed and moved to the governor's residence due to the COVID-19 pandemic.

Major legislation

Enacted
 April 12, 2019: Hands-free cell phone use while driving act
 May 2, 2019: Voluntary relationship defense for criminal sexual conduct repeal act
May 22, 2019: Assisted living act
 May 22, 2019: Opioid addiction prevention and treatment act
 Omnibus appropriations acts:
 May 22, 2019: Omnibus higher education act
 May 30, 2019: Omnibus agriculture, housing, and rural development act
 May 30, 2019: Omnibus transportation act
 May 30, 2019: Omnibus environment and natural resources act
 May 30, 2019: Omnibus judiciary and public safety act
 May 30, 2019: Omnibus jobs, economic development, and energy act
 May 30, 2019: Omnibus health and human services act
 May 30, 2019: Omnibus state government act
 May 30, 2019: Omnibus education act
 May 30, 2019: Omnibus legacy act
 May 30, 2019: Omnibus tax act
March 10, 2020: COVID-19 pandemic response act
March 17, 2020: COVID-19 pandemic response act
March 28, 2020: COVID-19 pandemic response act
April 7, 2020: COVID-19 first responders workers' compensation act
April 15, 2020: Alec Smith Insulin Affordability Act
April 15, 2020: COVID-19 pandemic response act
May 12, 2020: 2020 elections special procedures act
May 27, 2020: Outdoor heritage fund appropriations act
July 23, 2020: Police reform act
October 21, 2020: Omnibus capital investment "bonding" act

Proposed
Boldface indicates the bill was passed by its house of origin.

Clean Energy First Act (/)
 Energy Conservation and Optimization Act of 2020 (/)
 Extreme risk protection order bill (/)
 Family leave insurance bill (/)
Firearm transfer background check bill (/)
Omnibus environment and natural resources bill (/)
Proposed constitutional amendment establishing a fundamental right to a quality public education bill (/)
 Recreational cannabis bill (/)
 Voting rights restoration for felons bill (/)

Political composition
Resignations and new members are discussed in the "Changes in membership" section below.

Senate

House of Representatives

Leadership

Senate
 President:
 Jeremy Miller (R) (until November 12, 2020)
 David Tomassoni (I) (from November 12, 2020)
 President pro tempore: Mary Kiffmeyer (R)

Majority (Republican) leadership
 Majority Leader: Paul Gazelka
 Deputy Majority Leader: Michelle Benson
 Assistant Majority Leaders:
Gary Dahms
 Karin Housley
 John Jasinski
 Warren Limmer
 Eric Pratt
 Majority Whips:
 John Jasinski
 Eric Pratt

Minority (DFL) leadership
 Minority Leader:
 Tom Bakk (until February 1, 2020)
 Susan Kent (from February 1, 2020)
 Assistant Minority Leaders:
 Nick Frentz (from February 7, 2020)
 Jeff Hayden
 Susan Kent (until February 1, 2020)
 Carolyn Laine
 Erik Simonson (from February 7, 2020)
 Minority Whips:
 Ann Rest
 Kent Eken
 John Hoffman

House of Representatives

 Speaker: Melissa Hortman (DFL)
 Speakers pro tempore:
 Gene Pelowski (DFL)
 Paul Marquart (DFL)
 Jeanne Poppe (DFL)
 Liz Olson (DFL)
 Laurie Halverson (DFL)
 Tony Albright (R)

Majority (DFL) leadership
 Majority Leader: Ryan Winkler
 Majority Whip: Liz Olson
 Assistant Majority Leaders:
 Jamie Becker-Finn
 Hodan Hassan
 Mary Kunesh-Podein
 Fue Lee
 Jamie Long
 Julie Sandstede

Minority (Republican) leadership
 Minority Leader: Kurt Daudt
Deputy Minority Leader: Anne Neu
Minority Whip: Dan Fabian
Assistant Minority Leaders:
Tony Albright
Peggy Bennett
 Josh Heintzeman
 Jon Koznick
 Jim Nash
 Peggy Scott

Members

House of Representatives
On December 8, 2018, four Republican members of the House (Reps. Steve Drazkowski of Mazeppa, Cal Bahr of East Bethel, Tim Miller of Prinsburg, Jeremy Munson of Lake Crystal) announced that they would not join the Republican caucus in the 91st Legislature and instead would form a new caucus, called the "New Republican Caucus." They cited displeasure with "the attitudes and actions by [Leader Daudt] and some of his supporters" and said they still consider themselves to be members of the Republican Party.

Religious composition 

Over half of the 91st legislature identify as Christian, 3% identify as Jewish, and 42% refused to state their affiliation. The single largest religious denomination are Lutherans with 39 members; 21 in the house (15.6%), and 18 in the senate (26.9%).

Minority composition 
22 legislators identified themselves or were identified in a newspaper or book as a member of a minority group.

Changes in membership

Senate

House of Representatives

Committees

Senate

House of Representatives

Administrative officers

Senate
 Secretary: Cal Ludeman
 First Assistant Secretary: Colleen Pacheco
 Second Assistant Secretary: Mike Linn
 Engrossing Secretary: Melissa Mapes
 Sergeant at Arms: Sven Lindquist
 Assistant Sergeant at Arms: Marilyn Logan
 Chaplain: Mike Smith

House of Representatives
 Chief Clerk: Patrick Murphy
 First Assistant Chief Clerk: Tim Johnson
 Second Assistant Chief Clerk: Gail Romanowski
 Chief Sergeant at Arms: Bob Meyerson
 Assistant Sergeant at Arms: Erica Brynildson
 Assistant Sergeant at Arms: Andrew Olson
 Index Clerk: Carl Hamre

Notes

References

External links
 Legislature
2019 Regular Session Laws
 2019, 1st Special Session Laws
2020 Regular Session Laws
2020, 1st Special Session Laws
2020, 2nd Special Session Laws
2020, 3rd Special Session Laws
 Senate
List of bill summaries prepared by the Senate Counsel, Research and Fiscal Analysis Office
 List of act summaries prepared by the Senate Counsel, Research and Fiscal Analysis Office
 Fiscal tracking spreadsheets prepared by the Senate Counsel, Research and Fiscal Analysis Office
 House of Representatives
List of bill summaries prepared by the House Research Department
 List of act summaries prepared by the House Research Department
 Fiscal tracking spreadsheets prepared by the House Fiscal Analysis Department

Minnesota legislative sessions
2010s in Minnesota
2019 in Minnesota
2020 in Minnesota
2019 U.S. legislative sessions
2020 U.S. legislative sessions